Péter Kiss ( – ) was a Hungarian mathematician, Doctor of Mathematics, and professor of mathematics at Eszterházy Károly College, who specialized in number theory. In 1992 he won the Albert Szent-Györgyi Prize for his achievements.

Life

He was born in Nagyréde, Hungary, in 1937.

He majored in Mathematics and Physics from Eötvös Loránd University. After graduation, he taught mathematics at Gárdonyi Géza Secondary School in Eger. In 1971 he was appointed to Teacher's College, and in 1972 he began teaching at the Department of Mathematics of Eszterházy Károly University.

He earned the Doctorate of Mathematics degree from the Hungarian Academy of Sciences in 1999.

He was the doctoral advisor for mathematicians like Ferenc Mátyás, Sándor Molnár, Béla Zay, Kálman Liptai, László Szalay. He also assisted other colleagues like Bui Minh Phong, Lászlo Gerőcs, and Pham Van Chung, in the writing of their dissertations.

He was a member of the János Bolyai Mathematical Society, where he held different positions.

Many of his academic papers have been published in the zbMATH database in the Periodica Mathematica Hungarica, in the Proceedings of the Japan Academy, Series A, in Mathematics of Computation, in the Fibonacci Quarterly, and in the American Mathematical Society journals.

Academic papers

References

20th-century Hungarian mathematicians
1937 births
2002 deaths
Number theorists